Parazuphium is a genus of beetles in the family Carabidae, containing the following species:

 Parazuphium angolanum Mateu, 1993 
 Parazuphium angustioculum Hurka, 1982
 Parazuphium bactrianum K. Daniel & J. Daniel, 1898 
 Parazuphium baeticum K. Daniel & J. Daniel, 1898
 Parazuphium barbarae Baehr, 1985
 Parazuphium basilewskyi Mateu, 1993 
 Parazuphium basutolandicus Mateu, 1993 
 Parazuphium blandum Mateu, 1990   
 Parazuphium chevrolatii Laporte, 1833
 Parazuphium damascenum Fairmaire, 1897
 Parazuphium darlingtoni Baehr, 1985 
 Parazuphium debile (Peringuey, 1899) 
 Parazuphium dubium Mateu, 1994 
 Parazuphium feloi Machado, 1998
 Parazuphium flavescens Baehr, 1985
 Parazuphium impressicolle (Fairmaire, 1901) 
 Parazuphium inconspicuum (Schmidt-Goebel, 1846) 
 Parazuphium laticolle Basilewsky, 1962 
 Parazuphium longipenis Mateu, 1993 
 Parazuphium maroccanum Antoine, 1963
 Parazuphium mastersii (Castelnau, 1867)
 Parazuphium melanocephalum (Basilewsky, 1948) 
 Parazuphium mirei Mateu, 1993 
 Parazuphium narzikulovi Mikhailov, 1972
 Parazuphium nitens Mateu, 1993 
 Parazuphium novaki J. Muller, 1934
 Parazuphium pallidum (Basilewsky, 1948) 
 Parazuphium philippinense (Jedlicka, 1935) 
 Parazuphium punicum K. Daniel & J. Daniel, 1898
 Parazuphium ramirezi J. Vives & E. Vives, 1976
 Parazuphium rarum Mateu, 1993 
 Parazuphium roberti (Fairmaire, 1897) 
 Parazuphium rockhamptonense (Castelnau, 1867)
 Parazuphium sinuum (Darlington, 1968) 
 Parazuphium tropicum Baehr, 1985 
 Parazuphium turcomanicum Reitter, 1908
 Parazuphium varians Mateu, 1993 
 Parazuphium vaucheri Vauloger De Boupre, 1898
 Parazuphium vibex Motschulsky, 1844
 Parazuphium weiri Baehr, 1985

References

Dryptinae